The Bangla Academy is an autonomous institution funded by the Bangladesh government that fosters the Bengali language, literature and culture, works to develop and implement national language policy and to do original research in the Bengali language. Established in 1955, it is located in Burdwan House in Ramna, Dhaka, within the grounds of the University of Dhaka and Suhrawardy Udyan. The Bangla Academy hosts the annual Ekushey Book Fair.

History

The importance of establishing an organisation for Bengali language was first emphasised by the linguist Muhammad Shahidullah. Later, following the Language movement, on 27 April 1952, the All Party National Language Committee decided to demand establishment of an organisation for the promotion of Bengali language. During the 1954 parliamentary elections, the United Front's 21-point manifesto stated that, "The prime minister from the United Front will dedicate the Bardhaman House, also known as Burdwan House, for establishing a research center for the Bengali language". The building was the official residence of the Chief Minister of East Pakistan, Nurul Amin during the Language movement and part of the University of Dhaka before that. Following the election success of the Front, the education minister Syed Azizul Haque placed the order to fulfill this promise.

In 1955, the government formed a committee to expedite the process. The committee was composed of leading intellectuals like Muhammad Shahidullah, Qazi Motahar Hossain, S.M. Bhattacharya, W. H. Shadani, and Muhammad Barkatullah. On 3 December 1955, the Chief Minister of East Bengal, Abu Hussain Sarkar, inaugurated the institute. Barkatullah acted as the Special Officer in charge. Later, in 1956, Muhammad Enamul Haque took over as the first director.

In 1957, an act of the parliament formally established the funding source and the Government support for the institute. The first book published by the academy was Laili Maznu, an epic by the medieval poet Dawlat Ujir Bahram Khan, and edited by Ahmed Sharif. The first fellow of the academy was the poet Farrukh Ahmed.

The publication division was established in early 1957; the research, culture and library divisions and translation division were set in 1958 and 1961 respectively.

After the independence of Bangladesh, the director's position was renamed Director General. Mazharul Islam, head of Bangla Department of Rajshahi University, was the first Director General of the institute.
On 19 September 2008, a new 8-storied building, containing a 500-capacity auditorium and a 100-capacity seminar room, opened next to the main building.

Structure
The functions and structure of the institute was devised on the model of the French Academy.

Divisions
 Research, compilation and folklore
 Language, literature, culture and publication
 Textbook
 Planning and training

Activities

The main task of the academy is to conduct research on Bengali language, culture, and history, and to publish Bengali literary and research work.

To commemorate the Language movement and the Language martyr's day, the academy organizes the month-long Ekushey Book Fair, the largest book fair in the country. It was introduced by former director general Monzur-I-Mowla.

Criticism 
In recent years, Bangla Academy has been widely criticized for allowing different organizations to arrange events in English and denigrating Bengali in the premise of Bangla Academy, which is a violation of visions of the institution. "The Academy has misused                           a lot of funds in producing useless books, books that  are unoriginal," opines Salimullah Khan. Khan is of the opinion that the academy is short on original publications long on dross. He believes that both in research and in the field of creative writing, originality must be given priority. He also adds that most of the problems lie in the process of selection. The selection process the crucial decision to ditch one manuscript to pick another that will be added to the long list of academy publications, is faulty and in dire need of revision.

Awards given by Bangla Academy

Bangla Academy Literary Award

Rabindra Award
This award is conferred for significant contributions to Rabindranath Tagore works.
 2010 – Kalim Sharafi and Sanjida Khatun
 2011 – Ahmed Rafiq and Ajit Roy
 2012 – Anisur Rahman, Fahmida Khatun and Iffat Ara Dewan
 2013 – Karunamaya Goswami and Papia Sarwar
 2014 – Manzoore Mawla and Rezwana Chowdhury Bannya
 2015 – Sanat Kumar Saha and Sadi Mohammad
 2016 – Syed Akram Hossain and Tapan Mahmud
 2017 – Hayat Mamud and Mita Haque

Mazharul Islam Poetry Award

This award is conferred to the Bangladeshi poets since 2010.

Presidents

List of Honorary Fellows
As of 2022, there are 193 persons made Honorary Fellows by the academy.

References

 
1955 establishments in East Pakistan
Learned societies of Bangladesh
Cultural organisations based in Bangladesh
Bengali language
Bengali literary institutions
Education in Bangladesh
Cultural promotion organizations
Recipients of the Independence Day Award